Hsu Sheng-fa (24 January 1925 – 17 April 2021) was a Taiwanese businessman and politician. He served on the Legislative Yuan as a member of the Kuomintang from 1981 to 1990.

Hsu was born in 1925 in Japanese Taiwan. He founded Prince Motors in 1965. The company became a Taiwan-based sales agent of Suzuki Motors. As the company fell into debt, a layoff affecting 1,000 employees took place, which led to a protest outside company headquarters in November 2012.

Hsu founded Cosmos Bank, the predecessor to KGI Bank, in 1992. He sold eighty percent of the bank's shares in 2007, and stepped down as chairman. In 2008, Hsu was investigated and questioned by the Taipei District Prosecutors' Office regarding alleged embezzlement.

Hsu was a member of the Legislative Yuan between 1981 and 1990. He remained politically active after leaving the legislature, serving on the Central Standing Committee of the Kuomintang as well as chairing the China National Federation of Industry. He later worked for Lien Chan's 2000 presidential campaign, and served on the Straits Exchange Foundation.

Hsu has three children. His only son Hsu Sen-rong was vice chairman of Cosmos Bank. His daughters are Hsu Juan-juan and  Hsu Hsien-hsien, who married Eugene Wu.

References

1925 births
2021 deaths
Members of the 1st Legislative Yuan in Taiwan
Kuomintang Members of the Legislative Yuan in Taiwan
Party List Members of the Legislative Yuan
Taiwanese company founders
20th-century Taiwanese businesspeople
21st-century Taiwanese businesspeople
Taiwanese bankers
Automotive businesspeople